Glenn G. Tobin (born November 19, 1950) was a Canadian politician. He represented the electoral district of Burin-Placentia West in the Newfoundland and Labrador House of Assembly from 1982 to 1996. He was a member of the Progressive Conservative Party of Newfoundland and Labrador.

Tobin worked as a social worker in Marystown, Newfoundland and Labrador, where he also served as a town councillor and deputy mayor. He was elected to the Newfoundland assembly in 1982. He served in the provincial cabinet as Minister of Social Services, and Works and Minister of Services and Transportation. Tobin also served as deputy opposition house leader.

After leaving politics, he became manager and operator of Island Trucking Ltd. In 2004, he was named chair of the Newfoundland and Labrador Liquor Corporation.

References

1950 births
Living people
Progressive Conservative Party of Newfoundland and Labrador MHAs